Sumeet Vyas (born 27 July 1983) is an Indian actor and writer of films, web series and theatre. His breakthrough role was Mikesh Chaudhary in TVF's 2014 web series Permanent Roommates. Vyas has since played supporting roles in Bollywood films including  English Vinglish, Parched and Guddu Ki Gun, and  Veere Di Wedding. He has his first starring role in 2016 drama film Ribbon; his performance was well received by critics. Apart from acting in films and television programmes, Vyas also appears in theatre productions in India.

Early life
Vyas was born in Jodhpur, Rajasthan to writer B.M Vyas and Sudha Vyas. He spent his initial years there before moving to Mumbai to pursue his passion for acting and writing. He has attended R.D. National College, Mumbai. During his school days, Sumeet aspired to become a pilot or a computer engineer. But, he had a passion for acting and writing also. Later, choosing the second option, he gave up his college studies and started working as an assistant editor in an editing studio in Mumbai.

Acting career
Vyas made his television debut with a small role in the Doordarshan serial Woh Huye Na Humare. He then starred in TV show Rehna Hai Teri Palkon Ki Chhaon Mein as Karthik. He has been actively involved in the theatre since his early days as an actor. He also had a major role in the TV series Stories by Rabindranath Tagore. He made his Bollywood debut in the movie Jashn in 2009. Then he went on to act in movie English Vinglish. He has worked in more than 30 movies, including Guddu Ki Gun, Parched, Aurangzeb, and Kajarya.

He worked in many web series, including Permanent Roommates and TVF Tripling, the latter of which he also co-wrote. He has written the Y-Films web series "Bang Baaja Baaraat".

He starred in a Web Campaign by BigRock in 2017.

Personal life
Vyas is an active supporter of theatre and claims to enjoy working as a theatre artist rather than in Bollywood. He was married to actress Shivani Tanksale for 7 years. Later, he married TV actress Ekta Kaul on 15 September 2018. The couple is blessed with a baby boy.

Filmography

Films

Television

Web series

References

External links 
 
 Sumeet Vyas at Instagram

1983 births
Living people
Indian male television actors
Indian male stage actors